Mirabad is a village in Rostaq Rural District, in the Central District of Khalilabad County, Razavi Khorasan Province, Iran. At the 2006 census, its population was 668, in 173 families.

References 

Populated places in Khalilabad County